The League of Extraordinary Gentlemen, also promoted as LXG, is a 2003 dieselpunk superhero film loosely based on the first volume of the comic book series of the same name by Alan Moore and Kevin O'Neill. Distributed by 20th Century Fox, it was released on 11 July 2003 in the United States, and 17 October in the United Kingdom. It was directed by Stephen Norrington and starred Sean Connery, Naseeruddin Shah, Peta Wilson, Tony Curran, Stuart Townsend, Shane West, Jason Flemyng, and Richard Roxburgh. It was Connery's final role in a theatrically released live-action film before his retirement in 2006 and death in 2020.

As with the comic book source material, the film features prominent pastiche and crossover themes set in the late 19th century. It features an assortment of fictional literary characters appropriate to the period who act as Victorian era superheroes. It draws on the works of Jules Verne, H. G. Wells, Bram Stoker, Sir Arthur Conan Doyle, H. Rider Haggard, Ian Fleming, Herman Melville, Oscar Wilde, Robert Louis Stevenson, Edgar Allan Poe, Gaston Leroux, and Mark Twain, albeit all adapted for the film.

It received generally unfavorable reviews but was financially successful, grossing over $179 million worldwide in theaters, and earning rental revenue of $48.6 million and DVD sales (as of 2003) of $36.4 million, against its $78 million budget.

Plot
In 1899, a terrorist group led by the Fantom breaks into the Bank of England to steal Leonardo da Vinci's blueprints of Venice's foundations. They then kidnap several German scientists while blowing up a zeppelin factory.

The British Empire sends Sanderson Reed to Kenya Colony to recruit adventurer and hunter Allan Quatermain, who had retired following the death of his son. Quatermain at first refuses until a group of assassins is sent to kill him, resulting in the death of his longtime friend, Nigel. In London, Quatermain meets "M", who explains that the Fantom plans to start a world war by bombing a secret meeting of world leaders in Venice. To prevent this, M is forming the latest generation of the League of Extraordinary Gentlemen, consisting of Quatermain, Captain Nemo, vampire chemist Mina Harker, and invisible thief Rodney Skinner.

The League travels to the London Docklands to recruit Dorian Gray, Mina's former lover who is immortal due to a missing cursed portrait. The Fantom and his assassins attack but the League, aided by U.S. Secret Service Agent Tom Sawyer, fends them off. Gray and Sawyer join the League. They then capture Edward Hyde in Paris, who transforms back into his alter ego, Dr. Henry Jekyll, and joins the League after being offered amnesty. The League travels to Venice in Nemo's submarine, the Nautilus, but they soon deduce there may be a mole on board when a camera's flash powder residue is found in the wheelhouse and one of Jekyll's transformation formulas disappears. Suspicion falls on the missing Skinner.

The Nautilus arrives in Venice just as the bombs detonate, causing the Piazza San Marco and the rest of the city to start collapsing. Sawyer uses Nemo's automobile to stop the destruction, while Quatermain confronts the Fantom, who is unmasked as M. Dorian, the traitor, murders Nemo's first mate Ishmael and steals the Nautilus exploration pod. M and Dorian leave a phonograph recording for the League declaring that their true goal is to ignite the world war, and that Dorian has been collecting physical elements of the League to create a heavily armed version of the Nautilus, invisible spies, vampire assassins, and Hyde-like soldiers, and to sell the superhuman formulas off to the highest bidder. The Nautilus is damaged by bombs hidden on board, but Hyde saves it by draining the flooded engine rooms. Skinner secretly messages the League, informing them that he has sneaked aboard the exploration pod and telling them to follow his heading.

The League reaches northern Mongolia, where it reunites with Skinner and plots to destroy M's factory with explosives. Nemo and Hyde rescue the scientists and their families while fighting Dante, who overdoses on the Hyde formula. Skinner sets the explosive charges, and Mina battles and eventually kills Dorian by exposing him to his portrait. Quatermain and Sawyer confront M and identify him as Professor James Moriarty, longtime archenemy of genius detective Sherlock Holmes who had changed identities following his alleged death at the Reichenbach Falls. Sawyer is taken hostage by an invisible Reed; Quatermain shoots the latter, only to be fatally stabbed by Moriarty. Moriarty flees, but Sawyer shoots and kills him, and his samples sink into the icy water. Quatermain then dies.

Quatermain is buried beside his son in Kenya. The League recall how a witch doctor had blessed Quatermain for saving his village, promising that Africa would never let him die. The remaining League members—Nemo, Mina, Skinner, Jekyll, and Sawyer—depart, agreeing to keep using their powers for good in the coming 20th century. The witch doctor arrives and performs a ritual that summons an unnatural storm, with a bolt of lightning striking a rifle Sawyer left on Quatermain's grave.

Cast 
 Sean Connery as Allan Quatermain, an adventurer and hunter.
 Naseeruddin Shah as Captain Nemo, the captain of the Nautilus.
 Peta Wilson as Dr. Mina Harker, a chemist with vampire abilities following an encounter with Count Dracula.
 Tony Curran as Rodney Skinner, a gentleman thief who got his hands on Griffin's invisibility serum.
 Stuart Townsend as Dorian Gray, a man who is immortal due to his aging picture and is Fantom's double agent.
 Shane West as Tom Sawyer, an agent from the United States who aids the League of Extraordinary Gentlemen.
 Jason Flemyng as Dr. Henry Jekyll / Mr. Edward Hyde, a doctor turned human monster struggling with his new dual personality.
 Richard Roxburgh as The Fantom / "M" / Professor James Moriarty, an old enemy of Sherlock Holmes. As "Fantom", he leads a terrorist organization. As "M", he claims to be working for the British Empire.
 Tom Goodman-Hill as Sanderson Reed, the henchman of Professor Moriarty.
 David Hemmings as Nigel, a friend of Allan Quatermain.
 Terry O'Neill as Ishmael, Captain Nemo's first mate.
 Max Ryan as Dante, Fantom's second-in-command.

Production

Writing
Because 20th Century Fox was unable to secure the rights to the eponymous character of H. G. Wells' 1897 novel, the script referred to "The Invisible Man" as "An Invisible Man", and his name was changed from Hawley Griffin to Rodney Skinner. The Fu Manchu character was dropped. At the request of the studio, the character of Tom Sawyer was added to increase the film's appeal to American audiences and the youth demographic, a move that producer Don Murphy initially dismissed as a "stupid studio note" but later described as "brilliant".

Casting
After previously turning down the roles of the Architect in The Matrix trilogy and Gandalf in The Lord of the Rings trilogy, the latter of which would reportedly have earned him $450 million, Connery agreed to appear as Quatermain for $17 million, a sum that left the filmmakers with little flexibility to attract other high-profile stars for the ensemble cast.

A character named Eva Draper (Winter Ave Zoli), daughter of German scientist Karl Draper, remained visible in promotional materials despite not appearing in the film's final cut.

Filming

Principal photography took place in Hungary, Malta, and the Czech Republic.

The studio pressured filmmakers for a summer release because Master and Commander was slated for fall release. The production encountered delays when a special effects set failed to perform as intended, forcing the filmmakers to quickly look for another effects shop.

Connery reportedly had many disputes with director Stephen Norrington. Norrington did not attend the opening party and, on being asked where the director could be, Connery is said to have replied, "Check the local asylum". Norrington reportedly did not like the studio supervision and was "uncomfortable" with large crews.

Lawsuit
In 2003, Larry Cohen and Martin Poll sued 20th Century Fox for intentionally plagiarizing their script Cast of Characters, which they had pitched to the studio between 1993 and 1996. Noting that the scripts shared public-domain characters that had not appeared in The League of Extraordinary Gentlemen graphic novel series, the suit accused Fox of soliciting the series as a smokescreen. Fox denied the allegations as "absurd nonsense" but settled out of court, a decision Alan Moore believed "denied [him] the chance to exonerate" himself.

Reception

Box office
The film opened at #2 behind Pirates of the Caribbean: The Curse of the Black Pearl.  The League of Extraordinary Gentlemen grossed an estimated $66,465,204 in Canada and the United States, $12,603,037 in the United Kingdom, and $12,033,033 in Spain. Worldwide, the film took in $179,265,204.

Critical response
The site's critical consensus reads: "Just ordinary. LXG is a great premise ruined by poor execution." On Metacritic it has a score of 30% based on reviews from 36 critics, indicating "generally unfavorable reviews". Audiences polled by CinemaScore gave the film an average grade of "B−" on an A+ to F scale.

Roger Ebert of the Chicago Sun-Times gave the film one star out of a possible four: "The League of Extraordinary Gentlemen assembles a splendid team of heroes to battle a plan for world domination, and then, just when it seems about to become a real corker of an adventure movie, plunges into ... inexplicable motivations, causes without effects, effects without causes, and general lunacy".

Peter Travers of Rolling Stone gave it 1 out of 4 and wrote: "Except for Connery, who is every inch the lion in winter, nothing here feels authentic".

Owen Gleiberman of Entertainment Weekly gave the film a grade "C−". Empire magazine, giving it two stars out of five while criticizing its exposition and lack of character depth, saying it 'flirts dangerously close with one-star ignominy'.

Creators' response
In an interview with The Times, Kevin O'Neill, illustrator of the comics, said he believed the film failed (with the critics) because it was not respectful of the source material. He did not recognize the characters when reading the screenplay and claimed that Norrington and Connery did not cooperate. Finally, O'Neill said that the comic book version of Allan Quatermain was a lot better than the movie version and that marginalising Mina Murray as a vampire "changed the whole balance". The comics' author, Alan Moore, was cynical of the film from early in its development, seeing that the two works bore little resemblance, and distanced himself from the film. He said that he could profit from the film while leaving the original comics untouched: "As long as I could distance myself by not seeing [it], assured no one would confuse the two. This was probably naïve on my part".

Connery claimed that the film's production and final quality convinced him to permanently retire from filmmaking. He told The Times: "It was a nightmare. The experience had a great influence on me, it made me think about showbiz. I get fed up dealing with idiots". Norrington and screenwriters O'Neill and James Dale Robinson have not worked on a live action feature-length film as of 2023.

In other media

The League of Extraordinary Gentlemen earned a total of $48,640,000 in rentals with $14,810,000 from video rentals and $33,830,000 from DVD rentals. DVD sales meanwhile gathered revenue of $36,400,000.

A novelization of the movie was written by Kevin J. Anderson and released shortly before the movie.

The soundtrack album was also released internationally but not in the United States.

A Blu-Ray edition was re-released in October 2018 from Fabulous Films.

Reboot
The Tracking Board reported in May 2015 that 20th Century Fox and Davis Entertainment had agreed to develop a reboot with hopes of launching a franchise and that a search was underway for a director. John Davis told Collider in an interview that the reboot would be a female-centric film. Plans for a reboot were reportedly scrapped after the Disney/Fox merger in 2019. However, The Hollywood Reporter revealed in May 2022 that the reboot is back on track as a Hulu release with Justin Haythe writing and producer Don Murphy returning alongside Susan Montford and Erwin Stoff of 3 Arts Entertainment.

See also
 Penny Dreadful – a Showtime series involving famous figures from literary horror
 Anno Dracula – a mashup novel by Kim Newman
 Bungou Stray Dogs – a Japanese manga with a similar premise
 Persona 5 – a Japanese video game that features popular fictional and historical outlaws and gentleman thieves as main characters' initial Personas

References

External links

 
  
 
 
 
 Article at FilmForce about the film
 
 Stax's review at IGN of a revised version of the script
 Zone Troopers: Website about the different Allan Quatermain and King Solomon's Mine films

Film
2003 films
2003 action films
2000s fantasy adventure films
2000s superhero films
Action crossover films
Adventure crossover films
American action adventure films
American alternate history films
American crossover films
American fantasy adventure films
American fantasy comedy films
American superhero films
British action adventure films
British fantasy adventure films
German action adventure films
German fantasy adventure films
Crossover films
Dr. Jekyll and Mr. Hyde films
Films based on works by Alan Moore
Films based on The Picture of Dorian Gray
Films based on WildStorm titles
Films based on works by H. Rider Haggard
Films based on works by Jules Verne
Films based on works by Mark Twain
Films directed by Stephen Norrington
Films set in London
Films set in Paris
Films set in Venice
Films set in Kenya
Films set in Russia
Films set in 1899
Films set in the Victorian era
Films shot in the Czech Republic
Films shot in Morocco
Live-action films based on comics
Films involved in plagiarism controversies
Science fiction submarine films
Superhero crossover films
British vampire films
Works based on Dracula
20th Century Fox films
Czech action films
Czech adventure films
Czech fantasy films
Czech superhero films
Films scored by Trevor Jones
Films about giants
English-language Czech films
English-language German films
Gaslamp fantasy
Films produced by Don Murphy
2000s English-language films
2000s American films
2000s British films
2000s German films